This article is about the particular significance of the year 1772 to Wales and its people.

Incumbents
Lord Lieutenant of Anglesey - Sir Nicholas Bayly, 2nd Baronet
Lord Lieutenant of Brecknockshire and Monmouthshire – Thomas Morgan of Rhiwpera (until 15 May) Charles Morgan of Dderw (from 23 December)
Lord Lieutenant of Caernarvonshire - Thomas Wynn
Lord Lieutenant of Cardiganshire – Wilmot Vaughan, 1st Earl of Lisburne
Lord Lieutenant of Carmarthenshire – George Rice
Lord Lieutenant of Denbighshire - Richard Myddelton  
Lord Lieutenant of Flintshire - Sir Roger Mostyn, 5th Baronet 
Lord Lieutenant of Glamorgan – John Stuart, Lord Mountstuart (from 22 March)
Lord Lieutenant of Merionethshire - William Vaughan
Lord Lieutenant of Montgomeryshire – Henry Herbert, 1st Earl of Powis (until 11 September); 
Lord Lieutenant of Pembrokeshire – Sir William Owen, 4th Baronet
Lord Lieutenant of Radnorshire – Edward Harley, 4th Earl of Oxford and Earl Mortimer

Bishop of Bangor – John Ewer 
Bishop of Llandaff – Shute Barrington
Bishop of St Asaph – Jonathan Shipley
Bishop of St Davids – Charles Moss

Events
May - Walter Siddons appears on stage at Chester and joins the Kemble family troupe. 
The Stepney family of Prendergast sell their Pembrokeshire estates.
Henry Herbert is promoted to general, shortly before his death.

Arts and literature

New books

English language
Evan Evans (Ieuan Fardd) - The Love of our Country
Williams Evans - A New English-Welsh dictionary: Containing All Words Necessary for Reading an English Author
Jinny Jenks - Tour through Wales
Richard Price - Appeal … on the National Debt

Welsh language
Iolo Morganwg - Dagrau yr Awen
Job Orton - Eglwys yn y Ty : neu Bregeth am Grefydd-Deuluaidd.
Daniel Rowland - Pum Pregeth ac Amryw o Hymnau

Music
 William Williams Pantycelyn writes the words of the missionary hymn "O'er the Gloomy Hills of Darkness".

Births
10 January - William Jenkins Rees, antiquary (died 1855)
28 May - Hans Busk, poet (died 1862)
11 July - John Davies, missionary (died 1855)
July - Edward Hughes (Y Dryw), bard (died 1850)
26 October - Sir Watkin Williams-Wynn, 5th Baronet (died 1840)

Deaths
8 February - Augusta of Saxe-Gotha, Dowager Princess of Wales, 52 (throat cancer)
11 September - Henry Herbert, 1st Earl of Powis, 69 
October - Sir Thomas Stepney, 6th Baronet,
16 October - Richard Farrington, antiquary, 71

References

Wales
Wales